The 2017 European Junior & U23 Weightlifting Championships took place in Ramazan Njala Sports Palace, Durrës, Albania from 15 October to 21 October 2017.

Team ranking

Men Junior

Women Junior

Men Under-23

Women Under-23

Medal overview

Juniors

Men

Women

Under-23

Men

Women

Medal table
Ranking by Big (Total result) medals
 

Ranking by all medals: Big (Total result) and Small (Snatch and Clean & Jerk)

References
Start Book
Results Book (Archived version)

European Junior & U23 Weightlifting Championships
2017 in weightlifting
2017 in Albanian sport
Sport in Durrës
October 2017 sports events in Europe